The men's 200 metre freestyle competition of the swimming events at the 1967 Pan American Games took place on 29 July at the Pan Am Pool. It was the first appearance of this event in the Pan American Games.

This race consisted of four lengths of the pool, all in freestyle.

Results
All times are in minutes and seconds.

Heats

Final 
The final was held on July 29.

References

Swimming at the 1967 Pan American Games